In mathematics, a complex logarithm is a generalization of the natural logarithm to nonzero complex numbers. The term refers to one of the following, which are strongly related:
These logarithms are equally spaced along a vertical line in the complex plane.
Such complex logarithm functions are analogous to the real logarithm function , which is the inverse  of the real exponential function and hence satisfies   for all positive real numbers .

Ways of dealing with this include branches, the associated Riemann surface, and partial inverses of the complex exponential function. The principal value defines a particular complex logarithm function  that is continuous except along the negative real axis; on the complex plane with the negative real numbers and 0 removed, it is the analytic continuation of the (real) natural logarithm.

Problems with inverting the complex exponential function

For a function to have an inverse, it must map distinct values to distinct values; that is, it must be injective. But the complex exponential function is not injective, because  for any complex number  and integer , since adding  to  has the effect of rotating  counterclockwise  radians. So the points

equally spaced along a vertical line, are all mapped to the same number by the exponential function.  This means that the exponential function does not have an inverse function in the standard sense.  There are two solutions to this problem.

Another way to resolve the indeterminacy is to view the logarithm as a function whose domain is not a region in the complex plane, but a Riemann surface that covers the punctured complex plane in an infinite-to-1 way.

Branches have the advantage that they can be evaluated at complex numbers. On the other hand, the function on the Riemann surface is elegant in that it packages together all branches of the logarithm and does not require an arbitrary choice as part of its definition.

Principal value

Definition
For each nonzero complex number , the principal value  is the logarithm whose imaginary part lies in the interval . The expression  is left undefined since there is no complex number  satisfying .

When the notation  appears without any particular logarithm having been specified, it is generally best to assume that the principal value is intended. In particular, this gives a value consistent with the real value of  when  is a positive real number.

Calculating the principal value
The absolute value is real and positive.

This leads to the following formula for the principal value of the complex logarithm:

The principal value as an inverse function
Another way to describe  is as the inverse of a restriction of the complex exponential function, as in the previous section. The conformal mapping section below explains the geometric properties of this map in more detail.

The principal value as an analytic continuation
On the region  consisting of complex numbers that are not negative real numbers or 0, the function  is the analytic continuation of the natural logarithm.  The values on the negative real line can be obtained as limits of values at nearby complex numbers with positive imaginary parts.

Properties
Not all identities satisfied by  extend to complex numbers. For this reason, one cannot always apply  to both sides of an identity  to deduce .

but

If  approaches  from above, then  approaches , which is also the value of  itself. But if  approaches  from below, then  approaches .

Branches of the complex logarithm
Is there a different way to choose a logarithm of each nonzero complex number so as to make a function  that is continuous on all of ? The answer is no. In particular, which contradicts .

To obtain a continuous logarithm defined on complex numbers, it is hence necessary to restrict the domain to a smaller subset  of the complex plane. Because one of the goals is to be able to differentiate the function, it is reasonable to assume that the function is defined on a neighborhood of each point of its domain; in other words,  should be an open set. Also, it is reasonable to assume that  is connected, since otherwise the function values on different components of  could be unrelated to each other. All this motivates the following definition:

For example, the principal value defines a branch on the open set where it is continuous, which is the set  obtained by removing 0 and all negative real numbers from the complex plane.

Another example: The Mercator series
 

Once a branch is fixed, it may be denoted "" if no confusion can result. Different branches can give different values for the logarithm of a particular complex number, however, so a branch must be fixed in advance (or else the principal branch must be understood) in order for "" to have a precise unambiguous meaning.

Branch cuts
The argument above involving the unit circle generalizes to show that no branch of  exists on an open set  containing a closed curve that winds around 0. One says that " has a branch point at 0".  To avoid containing closed curves winding around 0,  is typically chosen as the complement of a ray or curve in the complex plane going from 0 (inclusive) to infinity in some direction. In this case, the curve is known as a branch cut. For example, the principal branch has a branch cut along the negative real axis.

If the function  is extended to be defined at a point of the branch cut, it will necessarily be discontinuous there; at best it will be continuous "on one side", like  at a negative real number.

The derivative of the complex logarithm
Since the exponential function is holomorphic (that is, complex differentiable) with nonvanishing derivative, the complex analogue of the inverse function theorem applies. Another way to prove this is to check the Cauchy–Riemann equations in polar coordinates.

Constructing branches via integration
The function  for real  can be constructed by the formula

If the range of integration started at a positive number  other than 1, the formula would have to be

instead.

In developing the analogue for the complex logarithm, there is an additional complication: the definition of the complex integral requires a choice of path. All this leads to the following:

The complex logarithm as a conformal map

 Rays emanating from 0 in the z-plane are mapped to horizontal lines in the w-plane.

Each circle and ray in the z-plane as above meet at a right angle. Their images under Log are a vertical segment and a horizontal line (respectively) in the w-plane, and these too meet at a right angle. This is an illustration of the conformal property of Log.

The associated Riemann surface

Construction
The various branches of  cannot be glued to give a single continuous function  because two branches may give different values at a point where both are defined. These agree on the upper half plane, but not on the lower half plane. So it makes sense to glue the domains of these branches only along the copies of the upper half plane. The resulting glued domain is connected, but it has two copies of the lower half plane.

The final result is a connected surface that can be viewed as a spiraling parking garage with infinitely many levels extending both upward and downward.

The logarithm function on the Riemann surface
Because the domains of the branches were glued only along open sets where their values agreed, the branches glue to give a single well-defined function . This process of extending the original branch  by gluing compatible holomorphic functions is known as analytic continuation.

Gluing all branches of log z 
This yields the same Riemann surface  and function  as before. This approach, although slightly harder to visualize, is more natural in that it does not require selecting any particular branches.

Every branch of  arises in this way.

The Riemann surface as a universal cover

As a complex manifold,  is biholomorphic with  via .

Applications
 The complex logarithm is needed to define exponentiation in which the base is a complex number. The expression  has a single value if and only if  is an integer.
 Since the mapping  transforms circles centered at  into vertical straight line segments, it is useful in engineering applications involving an annulus.

Generalizations

Logarithms to other bases
Just as for real numbers, one can define for complex numbers  and 
 
For example, using the principal value gives

Logarithms of holomorphic functions

Notes

References
 
 
 
 
 
 
 

Analytic functions
Logarithms